The 1916–17 Marquette Blue and Gold men's basketball team represented the Marquette University during the 1916–17 NCAA college men's basketball season. The head coach was Ralph Risch, it was his first season as head coach.

Schedule

|-

Statistics
Al Delmore 7.3 ppg

References

Marquette Golden Eagles men's basketball seasons
Marquette
Marq
Marq